This is a list of Canadian television related events from 1989.

Events

Debuts

Ending this year

Changes of network affiliation

Television shows

1950s
Country Canada (1954–2007)
Hockey Night in Canada (1952–present)
The National (1954–present)
Front Page Challenge (1957–1995)

1960s
CTV National News (1961–present)
Land and Sea (1964–present)
Man Alive (1967–2000)
Mr. Dressup (1967–1996)
The Nature of Things (1960–present, scientific documentary series)
Question Period (1967–present, news program)
The Tommy Hunter Show (1965–1992)
W-FIVE (1966–present, newsmagazine program)

1970s
The Beachcombers (1972–1990)
Canada AM (1972–present, news program)
the fifth estate (1975–present, newsmagazine program)
Live It Up! (1978–1990)
Marketplace (1972–present, newsmagazine program)
You Can't Do That on Television (1979–1990)
100 Huntley Street (1977–present, religious program)

1980s
Adrienne Clarkson Presents (1988–1999)
Bumper Stumpers (1987–1990)
The Campbells (1986–1990)
CityLine (1987–present, news program)
CODCO (1987–1993)
The Comedy Mill (1986–1991)
Danger Bay (1984–1990)
The Journal (1982–1992)
Just For Laughs (1988–present)
Midday (1985–2000)
My Secret Identity (1988–1991)
Night Heat (1985–1989)
On the Road Again (1987–2007)
The Raccoons (1985–1992)
Street Legal (1987–1994)
Super Dave (1987–1991)
Switchback (1981–1990)
Talkabout (1988-1990)
T. and T. (1987–1990)
Under the Umbrella Tree (1986–1993)
Venture (1985–2007)
Video Hits (1984–1993)

TV movies, miniseries and specials
Champagne Charlie
The French Revolution
It's a Razorbacks Christmas Barbeque
Looking for Miracles
Love and Hate: The Story of Colin and JoAnn Thatcher
The Paper Wedding (Les Noces de papier)
Pray for Me, Paul Henderson
The Railway Dragon
Les Tisserands du pouvoir - French version
Where the Spirit Lives

Births
Nick Nemeroff - Canadian stand-up comedian (died 2022)

References

See also
 1989 in Canada
 List of Canadian films of 1989

1989 in Canadian television